Lori Dupuis (born November 14, 1972) is a Canadian women's ice hockey player.

Playing career
Dupuis was born and raised just outside Cornwall, Ontario. She is a former member of the Cornwall Wolverines of the OWHA. She started with the Wolverines at the age of 10, and won Provincial "C" and "B" Championships. After playing minor ice hockey in Cornwall, Dupuis attended the University of Toronto, where she played with the Varsity Lady Blues from 1991 to 1997 and was nominated as female athlete of the year in 1996 and 1997. Dupuis was captain of the Lady Blues women's ice hockey team program from 1994 to 1996. During the 1992-93 season, she was the Blues Alternate Captain. In 1994-95, she was second in league scoring. In that same season, she was an OWIAA First Team All-Star, and a nominee for the U of T Female Athlete of the Year Award. In 1993-94 she was an OWIAA Second Team All-Star. In 1992-93 Dupuis was an OWIAA First Team All-Star and the Blues Alternate Captain.

Brampton Thunder
After University, Dupuis joined the Brampton Thunder of the National Women's Hockey League. She was named to the 1998-99 NWHL Western Division 2nd All-Star Team. During the 2000–01 NWHL season, Dupuis played with the Brampton Thunder and finished sixth in league scoring with 38 points. Dupuis continues to play for the Brampton Thunder, a team in the Canadian Women's Hockey League.

Hockey Canada
Dupuis joined Team Canada in the mid-1990s. In 1995 she was a member of Team Canada, winners of the Pacific Rim Tournament. She helped the team win world championships in 1997, 1999 and 2000.  In 1998, she helped her team win the silver medal at the Olympic Winter Games in Nagano. The pinnacle of her career was Team Canada's gold medal win at the 2002 Winter Olympics in Salt Lake City.

Personal
A graduate of General Vanier S.S. in Cornwall, Dupuis competed at OFSAA Provincial Championships for each of her five years. She is also a graduate of the University of Toronto (French and Geography). At one time, she ran a hockey school with Jayna Hefford.

Awards and honours
 Member of the Brampton Thunder – CWHL (1998 to present)
 Clarkson Cup Top Forward, 2010
 CWHL Second All-Star Team, 2009–10
 CWHL Championship Game MVP, 2008
 NWHL West Second All-Star Team, 1998–99
 1994-95 OWIAA First Team All-Stars
 1994-95 nominee for University of Toronto Female Athlete of the Year Award
 1993-94 OWIAA Second Team All-Star
 1992-93 OWIAA First Team All-Star
 2-time Olympian (1998, 2002) - 1 gold medal
 3 World Championships - 3 gold medals

References

External links
 Brampton Thunder profile

1972 births
Living people
Brampton Thunder players
Canadian women's ice hockey forwards
Sportspeople from Cornwall, Ontario
Ice hockey players at the 1998 Winter Olympics
Ice hockey players at the 2002 Winter Olympics
Medalists at the 1998 Winter Olympics
Medalists at the 2002 Winter Olympics
Olympic gold medalists for Canada
Olympic ice hockey players of Canada
Olympic medalists in ice hockey
Olympic silver medalists for Canada
University of Toronto alumni
Ice hockey people from Ontario